Submucosal may refer to:

 Submucous plexus
 Submucosa